Salem Khamis Faraj Alem (born September 19, 1980) is an Emirati football player who currently plays as a midfielder for the United Arab Emirates national team .

References

External links
 

1980 births
Living people
Emirati footballers
United Arab Emirates international footballers
Al Ahli Club (Dubai) players
Al-Nasr SC (Dubai) players
Sharjah FC players
Ajman Club players
Al-Arabi SC (UAE) players
Masfout Club players
2004 AFC Asian Cup players
UAE First Division League players
UAE Pro League players
Footballers at the 2002 Asian Games
Association football midfielders
Asian Games competitors for the United Arab Emirates